The brown-throated sloth (Bradypus variegatus)  is a species of three-toed sloth found in the Neotropical realm of Central and South America.

It is the most common of the four species of three-toed sloth, and is found in the forests of South and Central America.

Description 

The brown-throated sloth is of similar size and build to most other species of three-toed sloths, with both males and females being  in total body length.

The head is rounded, with a blunt nose and inconspicuous ears. As with other sloths, the brown-throated sloth has no incisor or canine teeth, and the cheek teeth are simple and peg-like. They have no gall bladder, cecum, or appendix.

The brown-throated sloth has grayish-brown to beige-color fur over the body, with darker brown fur on the throat, the sides of the face, and the forehead. The face is generally paler in color, with a stripe of very dark fur running beneath the eyes.

The guard hairs are very coarse and stiff, and overlie a much softer layer of dense under-fur. The hairs are unusual in lacking a central medulla, and have numerous microscopic cracks across their surfaces. These cracks are host to a number of commensal species of algae, including Rufusia pillicola, Dictyococcus bradypodis, and Chlorococcum choloepodis. The algae are generally absent in the hair of young sloths, and may also be absent in particularly old individuals, where the outer cuticle of the hair has been lost. Sloth hair also harbours a rich fungal flora. Certain strains of fungi that grow on brown-throated sloth fur have been shown to possess anti-parasitic, anti-cancer, and anti-bacterial qualities.

Over parts of its range, the brown-throated sloth overlaps the range of Hoffmann's two-toed sloth. Where this overlap occurs, the three-toed sloth tends to be smaller and more numerous than its relative, being more active in moving through the forest and maintaining more diurnal activity.

Distribution and habitat 
The brown-throated sloth is the most widespread and common of the three-toed sloths. It is found from Honduras in the north, through Nicaragua, Costa Rica and Panama into Venezuela, Colombia, Ecuador, Bolivia, Brazil and eastern Peru. It is probably not found immediately north of the Amazon Rainforest or east of the Rio Negro, although its similarity to the pale-throated sloth found in these regions has led to some confusion in the past.

It is found in many different kinds of environments, including evergreen and dry forests and in highly perturbed natural areas.

Behaviour and diet 

Brown-throated sloths sleep 15 to 18 hours every day and are active for only brief periods of time, which may be during either the day or night. Although they can walk along the ground, and even swim, they spend most of their lives in the high branches of trees, descending once every eight days or so to defecate in the soil. The brown-throated sloths are cathemeral, with no preference for sleeping at day or night. Large, curved claws and muscles specifically adapted for strength and stamina help them to keep a strong grip on tree branches. They are able to withstand hanging inverted for extended periods of time due to fibrinous adhesions which attach their organs (such as their liver and stomach) to their lower ribs. Given that feces and urine can account for up to a third of their body weight, this adaptation prevents these organs from pressing on the lungs when hanging upside down, making breathing easier. Adult animals are solitary, except when raising young, and males have been observed to fight one another using their fore claws.

Brown-throated sloths inhabit the high canopy of the forest, where they eat young leaves from a wide range of different trees. Within a typical,  range, a brown-throated sloth will visit around 40 trees, and may specialise on one particular species, even spending up to 20% of its time in a single specific tree. Thus, although the species are generalists, individual sloths may feed on a relatively narrow range of leaf types. Although they get most of their fluids from the leaves that they eat, brown-throated sloths have been observed drinking directly from rivers.

Sloths descend about once every eight days to defecate on the ground. The reason and mechanism behind this behavior have long been debated among scientists. There are at least five hypotheses: 1) fertilize trees when feces are deposited at the base of the tree; 2) cover feces and avoid predation; 3) chemical communication between individuals; 4) pick up trace nutrients in their claws, that are then ingested; and 5) favor a mutualistic relationship with populations of fur moths. More recently, a new hypothesis has emerged, which presents evidence against the previous ones and proposes that all current sloths are descendants from species that defecated on the ground, and there simply has not been enough selective pressure to abandon this behavior, since cases of predation during defecation are actually very rare.

In addition to the algae in their fur, brown-throated sloths also live commensally with a species of moth, Cryptoses choloepi, which lives in their fur, and lays its eggs in the dung.
Jaguars and harpy eagles are among the few natural predators of the brown-throated sloth. The yellow-headed caracara has been observed to forage for small invertebrates in the fur of the sloths, apparently without the sloth being disturbed by the attention.

The female of the species is known to emit a loud, shrill scream during the mating season to attract males. Its cry sounds like "ay ay", much like that of a woman screaming. The male can be identified by a black stripe surrounded by orange fur on its back between the shoulders.

Reproduction 
Brown-throated sloths have a polygynous mating system. Studies of the brown-throated sloth indicate that mating is most common between January and March in at least the northern parts of its range, but this may vary elsewhere. Gestation lasts at least seven months, and the single young is born fully furred and clawed. Young sloths cling to the mother's underside for five months or more, even though they are fully weaned after just four to five weeks.

The mammary glands of the females do not store significant quantities of milk as most other mammals do, since the infant sloth remains attached to the nipple at all times, and consumes the milk as soon as it is generated. The young begin to take solid food as early as four days after birth, initially licking particles of food from their mother's mouths. This process apparently allows them to quickly identify edible leaves, and young sloths typically have the same preferences for leaf types as their mothers.

In the wild, the lifespan of adult brown-throated three-toed sloths is typically between 30 and 40 years.

Taxonomy 
The brown-throated sloth was first described by Heinrich Rudolf Schinz in 1825 from a South American specimen. The type locality was later specified as "probably Bahia (Brazil)" by Robert Mertens in 1925.

The seven recognized subspecies of the brown-throated sloth, although these are not all readily distinguishable, are:
B. v. boliviensis Gray, 1871
B. v. brasiliensis Blainville, 1840
B. v. ephippiger Philippi, 1870
B. v. gorgon Thomas, 1926
B. v. infuscatus Wagler, 1831
B. v. trivittatus Cornalia, 1849
B. v. variegatus Schinz, 1825

The closest living relative of the species is the pale-throated sloth, which has a very similar appearance, except for the color of the fur around the throat. The two species are estimated to have diverged just 400,000 years ago, whereas their ancestors diverged from the maned sloth over 7 million years ago.

References

Further reading 

Sloths
Mammals of Brazil
Mammals of Bolivia
Mammals of Colombia
Mammals of Central America
Mammals of Ecuador
Mammals of Peru
Mammals of Venezuela
Fauna of the Amazon
Fauna of the Caatinga
Mammals described in 1825